Isaak "Tjaak" Pattiwael (23 February 1914 – 16 March 1987) was an Indonesian football forward who played for the Dutch East Indies in the 1938 FIFA World Cup. He also played for VV Jong Ambon Batavia.

References

External links
 

1914 births
1987 deaths
Indonesian footballers
Indonesian Christians
Indonesia international footballers
Association football forwards
VV Jong Ambon Batavia players
1938 FIFA World Cup players